Mount Forbes is a rural locality split between the City of Ipswich and the Scenic Rim Region, Queensland, Australia.

Geography

The land use is predominantly grazing on native vegetation.

History

John Oxley chose the name Mount Forbes in 1824, after Sir Francis Forbes (1784-1841) the then Chief Justice of New South Wales to name the mountain now known as  Mount Walker.

Mount Forbes Post Office opened on 1 July 1927 (a receiving office had been open from 1897) and closed in 1953.

Mount Forbes Provisional School opened on 10 November 1896. On 1 January 1909, it became Mount Forbes State School. It closed in 1948. It was at 222 Mount Forbes School Road.

Tenders were called in September 1910 to build a Methodist church. The stump-capping ceremony was held on Saturday 18 February 1911. Mount Forbes Methodist Church was officially opened on Sunday 7 May 1911 by Dr Henry Youngman, the President of the Methodist Church of Australasia; about 200 people attended. The church was at 211-215 Mount Forbes School Road.

In October 1994, the Woogaroo Koala Protection Society was established, being renamed Ipswich Koala Protection Society in 2000 as the group expanded its services to a wider area. A dedicated koala rehabilitation cline was established in Mount Forbes in 2010.

The locality contains 93 households, in which 50.0% of the population are males and 50.0% of the population are females with a median age of 35, 3 years below the national average. The average weekly household income is $1,520, $83 above the national average. 3.0% of Mount Forbes's population is either of Aboriginal or Torres Strait Islander descent. 70.5% of the population aged 15 or over is either registered or de facto married, while 29.5% of the population is not married. 34.3% of the population is currently attending some form of a compulsory education. The most common nominated ancestries were Australian (35.7%), English (27.5%) and German (9.9%), while the most common country of birth was Australia (78.7%), and the most commonly spoken language at home was English (83.3%). The most common nominated religions were No religion (24.3%), Not stated (20.6%) and Anglican (14.7%). The most common occupation was a technician/trades worker (17.6%) and the majority/plurality of residents worked 40 or more hours per week (46.3%).

Education
There are no schools in Mount Forbes. The nearest government primary schools are Mutdapilly State School in neighbouring Mutdapilly to the south-east and Rosewood State School in Rosewood to the north. The nearest government secondary school is Rosewood State High School in Rosewood to the north.

Amenities 
The Ipswich Koala Protection Society is at 110 Brass Road. It has two ambulances designed for koalas and rescues over 180 koalas each year. It provides care for sick, injured or orphaned koalas with the aim of rehabilitating them and returning them to the wild.

References

City of Ipswich
Scenic Rim Region
Localities in Queensland